Shekel or sheqel ( šiqlu or siqlu, plural   or shekels,) is an ancient Mesopotamian coin, usually of silver. A shekel was first a unit of weight—very roughly —and became currency in ancient Tyre and ancient Carthage and then in ancient Israel under the Maccabees.

Name 
The Š-Q-L root is found in the Hebrew words for "to weigh", "weight" and "consideration". The famous writing on the wall in the Biblical Book of Daniel includes a cryptic use of the word in Aramaic: "". The word shekel came into the English language via the Hebrew Bible, where it is first used in the Book of Genesis.

History 
The earliest shekels were a unit of weight, used as other units such as grams and troy ounces for trading before the advent of coins. The shekel was common among western Semitic peoples. Moabites, Edomites, and Phoenicians used the shekel, although proper coinage developed very late. Carthaginian coinage was based on the shekel and may have preceded its home town of Tyre in issuing proper coins.

Coins were used and may have been invented by the early Anatolian traders who stamped their marks to avoid weighing each time used. Herodotus states that the first coinage was issued by Croesus, King of Lydia, spreading to the golden Daric (worth 20  or shekel), issued by the Persian Empire and the silver Athenian obol and drachma. Early coins were money stamped with an official seal to certify their weight. Silver ingots, some with markings were issued. Later authorities decided who designed coins.

As with many ancient units, the shekel had a variety of values depending on the era, government and region; weights between 7 and 17  grams and values of 11, 14, and 17 grams are common. A two-shekel weight recently recovered near the temple area in Jerusalem and dated to the period of the First Temple weighs 23 grams, giving a weight of 11.5 grams per shekel in Israel during the monarchy. When used to pay labourers, recorded wages in the ancient world range widely. Later, records within the Persian Empire (539–333 BC) give ranges from a minimum of two shekels per month for unskilled labour, to as high as seven to ten shekels per month in some records. A survival wage for an urban household during the Persian period would require at least 22 shekels of income per year.

Israelites 

According to Jewish law, whenever a census of the Jewish people was to be conducted, every person that was counted was required to pay the half-Shekel for his atonement.

The Aramaic , similar to the Hebrew , used in the writing on the wall during the feast of Belshazzar according to the Book of Daniel and defined as weighed, shares a common root with the word shekel and may even additionally attest to its original usage as a weight.

Second Temple period half-Shekel Temple tax 

During the Second Temple period, it was customary among Jews to annually offer the half-Shekel into the Temple treasury, for the upkeep and maintenance of the Temple precincts, as also used in purchasing public animal offerings. This practice not only applied to Jews living in the Land of Israel, but also to Jews living outside the Land of Israel. Archaeological excavations conducted at Horvat 'Ethry in Israel from 1999 to 2001 by Boaz Zissu and Amir Ganor of the Israeli Antiquities Authority (IAA) have yielded important finds, the most-prized of which being a half-Shekel coin minted in the 2nd century CE, upon which are embossed the words "Half-Shekel" in paleo-Hebrew. The same coin possesses a silver content of 6.87 grams. According to the Jewish historian Josephus, the annual monetary tribute of the half-Shekel to the Temple at Jerusalem was equivalent to two Athenian drachmæ, each Athenian or Attic drachma weighing a little over 4.3 grams.

First and Second Jewish Revolt 
The Jerusalem shekel was issued from AD 66 to 70 amid the First Jewish Revolt as a means of emphasizing the independence of Judaea from Roman rule.

The Bar Kochba shekel was issued from AD 132 to 135 amid the Bar Kokhba Revolt for similar reasons.

Carthage 

The Carthaginian or Punic shekel was typically around 7.2 grams in silver and 7.5 grams in gold (suggesting an exchange rate of 12:1). They were apparently first developed on Sicily during the mid-4th century BC. They were particularly associated with the payment of Carthage's mercenary armies and were repeatedly debased over the course of each of the Punic Wars, although the Carthaginian Empire's expansion into Spain under the Barcids before the Second and recovery under Hannibal before the Third permitted improving the amount and quality of the currency. Throughout, it was more common for Carthage's holdings in North Africa to employ bronze or no coinage except when paying mercenary armies and for most of the specie to circulate in Spain, Sardinia, and Sicily.

Tyre 

The Tyrian shekel began to be issued . Owing to the relative purity of their silver, they were the preferred medium of payment for the Temple tax in Jerusalem despite their royal and pagan imagery. The money changers assaulted by Jesus in the New Testament are those who exchanged worshippers' baser common currency for such shekels and they have been suggested as a possible coin used as the "30 pieces of silver" in the New Testament.

Present

Israel 

The Israeli shekel ( in direct transcription) replaced the Israeli pound (lira) in 1980. It was subdivided into 100 new agoras or agorot. It suffered from hyperinflation and was quickly replaced.

The new shekel replaced it in 1985. Its currency sign is  although it is often notated as ש״ח or NIS. It is subdivided into 100 agoras or agorot. Both Israeli shekels are solely units of fiat currency and not weight of precious metals.

See also 

 Ancient Mesopotamian units of measurement
 Gerah (ma'ah)
 Hanukkah gelt
 History of currency
 Israeli lira
 List of historical currencies
 Pidyon Haben ceremony
 Prutah
 Tetradrachm
 Zuz

References

Citations

Bibliography

External links 

 

Ancient currencies
Currencies of Israel
Units of mass
Phoenician currency